Buddhi Dharma University (UBD) is a private university in Karawaci, Tangerang, Banten. It is the first Buddhist university in Indonesia. It is a transformation of the College of Buddhi, which is managed by the Religious Society and Social Boen Tek Bio. Four higher education institutions merged: STIE Buddhi, STMIK Buddhi, STBA Buddhi, and ASMI Buddhi.

History 

On December 12, 2014 the first Boen Tek Bio merged four higher education institutions (:id:Perguruan Tinggi Buddhi) and changed the name to Buddhi Dharma University. The UBD inauguration was conducted by the mayor of Tangerang Arief R Wismansyah on January 12, 2015. The inauguration ceremony inducted Harimurti Kridalaksana as rector.

Facilities 
Buddhi Dharma University has three lecture halls.

Faculties 
The faculty of Business offers Management, Accounting, Business Administration and Accounting (D3) courses.
The faculty of Science and Technology offers the departments of Physics, Electrical Engineering, Industrial Engineering, Information Engineering, Information Engineering, Software Engineering, Multimedia Engineering and Networks (D4), and Information Management (D3).
The faculty of Humanities and Literature includes English and Communication Studies departments.

References 

The information in this article is based on its Indonesian Equivalent.

Universities in Banten